Brahimaj is an Albanian surname. Its literal meaning is "son of Brahim/Ibrahim", which is similar to that of the Bosnian surname Ibrahimović and the Turkish family name İbrahimoğlu and may indicate Muslim religious affiliation of its bearer. Notable people with the name include:
Ahmet Brahimaj, Kosovar politician
Brixhild Brahimaj (born 1995), Albanian footballer
Edmond Brahimaj (born 1959), Albanian religious leader
Lahi Brahimaj (born 1970), Kosovo Liberation Army (KLA) commander

References

Surnames